The Anglo-Malayan Defence Agreement (AMDA) was set up on 19 September 1957 to provide a security umbrella for the newly independent Malaya. AMDA was a bilateral defence agreement between the United Kingdom and the Federation of Malaya, which also committed Australia and New Zealand to assist Britain in the defence of Malaysia. This agreement was used to justify Australian and New Zealand involvement in the Malayan Emergency and the Indonesian-Malaysian Confrontation. The agreement was formally signed by the British and Malayan Governments on 12 October 1957.

When Malaysia was created in 1963, AMDA was renamed the Anglo-Malaysian Defence Agreement and continued to provide some measure of security to the new federation. AMDA was later replaced with the FPDA.

Notes and references

Military history of Malaysia
1957 in Malaya
Treaties of the Federation of Malaya
Bilateral treaties of the United Kingdom
Treaties concluded in 1957
Malaysia–United Kingdom relations
Cold War treaties